Ephedrophila is a genus of snout moths. It was described by Constantin Dumont in 1928.

Species
 Ephedrophila algerialis (Hampson, 1900)
 Ephedrophila jordanalis (Rebel, 1902)
 Ephedrophila lucasi (Mabille, 1907)

References

Epipaschiinae
Pyralidae genera